Marinella Bortoluzzi (born 16 February 1939) is a former Italian female high jumper who competed at the 1960 Summer Olympics and won three national championships at the individual senior level from 1959 to 1963.

National titles
Italian Athletics Championships
High jump: 1959, 1961, 1963

References

External links
 

1939 births
Living people
Athletes (track and field) at the 1960 Summer Olympics
Italian female high jumpers
Olympic athletes of Italy